Wayne Lee Proudfoot  (born November 17, 1939) is an American scholar of religion and has written several works in that field, specializing in the philosophy of religion.

Proudfoot earned the degree of Master of Theology from the Harvard Divinity School in 1969, after which he taught at the College of Liberal Arts at the Lincoln Center campus of Fordham University in midtown Manhattan.

Proudfoot subsequently earned the degree of Doctorate of Philosophy from Harvard University (1972) and became a Professor of Religion at Columbia University. He has written several books about religious experience, most notably a book with that title. He has also published articles on Charles Peirce and William James.

Works
 Faithful Imagining: Essays in Honor of Richard R. Niebuhr / edited By Sang Hyun Lee, Wayne Proudfoot, Albert Blackwell     Atlanta, Ga. : Scholars Press, c1995 
 God and the Self: Three Types of Philosophy of Religion / Wayne Proudfoot     Lewisburg [Pa.] : Bucknell University Press, c1976
 Religious Experience / Wayne Proudfoot     Berkeley : University of California Press, c1985 
 William James and a Science of Religions: Reexperiencing the Varieties of Religious Experience / Wayne Proudfoot, Editor     New York : Columbia University Press, c2004

References

External links
 His biography @ Columbia University Department of Religion

1939 births
American philosophers
Columbia University faculty
Harvard Divinity School alumni
Living people
Religious philosophers